This is the list of meetings between the pope and the president of the United States. The first meeting between a pope and an incumbent U.S. president took place in the aftermath of World War I, January 1919, at the Vatican between Benedict XV and Woodrow Wilson. Altogether, there have been 31 meetings between six popes and 14 U.S. presidents over the past century.

Meetings

Gallery

Other meetings

Future popes meeting the president
Additionally, Eugenio Pacelli (the future Pope Pius XII) visited the United States for two weeks in October–November 1936 and met President Franklin D. Roosevelt at Hyde Park, New York on November 5, 1936.
  
President George W. Bush attended the funeral of Pope John Paul II on April 8, 2005 and briefly met Cardinal Joseph Ratzinger, later Pope Benedict XVI, who had led the Mass of Requiem. Bush was the first incumbent U.S. president to attend a papal funeral.

Future presidents meeting the pope 
According to his sister Corinne, future President Theodore Roosevelt, aged 11, met Pope Pius IX in Rome and kissed his hand when the Roosevelt family was travelling in Europe.

While Joe Biden was serving as a U.S. Senator, he met with Pope John Paul II on April 12, 1980 at the Vatican. During Biden's tenure as Vice President of the United States, he met Pope Francis on three occasions. Biden led the U.S. delegation at the Papal inauguration of Pope Francis in March 2013; he accompanied the pope during the pontiff's visit to the United States in September 2015; and met him at a Vatican conference on cancer research in April 2016.

Then-Vice President George H. W. Bush met Pope John Paul II on September 19, 1987 in Detroit. The pope was concluding a ten-day visit to the United States.

First ladies meeting the pope
Jacqueline Kennedy was the first First Lady of the United States to meet with a pope independent of her husband, the president. On March 11, 1962, she met with Pope John XXIII at the Vatican while en route to India and Pakistan.

Nancy Reagan met Pope John Paul II at the Vatican on May 4, 1985 while President Ronald Reagan was attending the 11th G7 summit in Bonn, West Germany. Mrs. Reagan met the pontiff again on September 16, 1987 in Los Angeles during his ten-day visit to the United States.

Laura Bush and her daughter Barbara Bush met Pope Benedict XVI at the Vatican on February 9, 2006. The First Lady was en route to the 2006 Winter Olympics in Turin.

Former presidents meeting the pope
After leaving office, former Presidents Martin Van Buren and Millard Fillmore met separately with Pope Pius IX in Rome in 1855. Pius IX also met Franklin Pierce in November 1857. In 1878, Ulysses S. Grant met Pope Leo XIII in the Vatican as part of his post-presidential world tour.

In April 1910, Theodore Roosevelt sought an audience with Pope Pius X. The Pope agreed to see him, provided Roosevelt would not call on some Methodist missionaries in Rome. Roosevelt had no intention of meeting the missionaries, but he declined to submit to Pius X's conditions and the interview did not take place. Theodore Roosevelt called the entire papal episode, "An elegant row."

See also
 Holy See–United States relations
 List of international trips made by presidents of the United States
 List of pastoral visits of Pope Paul VI
 List of pastoral visits of Pope John Paul II
 List of pastoral visits of Pope Benedict XVI
 List of pastoral visits of Pope Francis
 Papal travel

Notes

References

United States
Holy See–United States relations
Pope-related lists
Lists of United States presidential visits
United States history-related lists